Joan M. Quigley (born December 8, 1935) is an American Democratic Party politician who served in the New Jersey General Assembly from 1994 to 2012, representing the 32nd Legislative District. Quigley served as the Majority Conference Leader starting with the 2006–2008 legislative session. She was the Assembly's Deputy Speaker from 2004 to 2006 and was the Minority Parliamentarian from 1999 to 2001. She writes for the Jersey Journal.

Career
Quigley served in the Assembly on the State Government Committee (as chair), the Budget Committee, the Health and Senior Services Committee and the Legislative Services Commission.

Quigley sponsored legislation mandating registration of sex offenders and requiring filing of DNA types with state and national databases, and also sponsored legislation setting a statute of limitations on parking tickets.

Quigley is a Hospital administrator for the Bon Secours New Jersey Health System (former Franciscan Health System). She was previously employed as public information officer for the Hudson County Welfare Board and as executive director of a retired senior volunteer program of the Hudson County United Way.

She received an A.A. from Hudson County Community College in Public Policy, a B.A. in 1977 from Saint Peter's College, New Jersey in Urban Studies/Sociology and was awarded an M.P.A. in 1979 from Rutgers University in Public Administration.

In the wake of redistricting following the results of the 2010 United States census, the portion of Jersey City in which Quigley resides was removed from the 32nd District, and based on that change she decided in April 2011 not to seek re-election to a seventh term of office in the Assembly in November and was replaced on the general election ballot by Angelica M. Jimenez, a vice president of the board of education in West New York. Jimenez won the election and succeeded Quigley in the Assembly in January 2012.

Criticism of Ann Coulter
On June 8, 2006, Quigley and Assemblywoman Linda Stender publicly criticized Ann Coulter's book Godless: The Church of Liberalism. Stender and Quigley issued a press release in response to Coulter's criticism of the Jersey Girls, four widows of the September 11, 2001 attacks from New Jersey who have criticized U.S. policies in the events leading up to September 11. The press release called on New Jersey retailers to "express their outrage by refusing to carry or sell copies of Coulter's book."   They did not seek any legislative prohibition, but in the press release, they called on New Jersey retailers to "express their outrage by refusing to carry or sell copies of Coulter's book."

References

External links
 Assemblywoman Quigley's legislative web page , New Jersey Legislature
 New Jersey Legislature financial disclosure forms
 2010 2009 2008 2007 2006 2005 2004
 Assembly Member Joan M. Quigley, Project Vote Smart
 New Jersey Voter Information Website 2003

1935 births
Living people
Democratic Party members of the New Jersey General Assembly
Politicians from Jersey City, New Jersey
Rutgers University alumni
Saint Peter's University alumni
Women state legislators in New Jersey
21st-century American politicians
21st-century American women politicians